The 2022 season for the  team is its 14th season as a UCI WorldTeam and its 19th overall. International education company EF Education First continues as a co-title sponsor, while American shopping company EasyPost replaces Japanese construction company Nippo Corporation as the other co-title sponsor. However, Nippo will remain in the team's organization and be a co-title sponsor of the development team. They use Cannondale bicycles, Shimano drivetrain, Vision wheels and Rapha clothing.

Team roster 

Riders who joined the team for the 2022 season

Riders who left the team during or after the 2021 season

Season victories

National, Continental, and World Champions

Notes

References

External links 

 

EF Education–EasyPost
2022
EF Education–EasyPost